Sławomir Idziak (born 25 January 1945) is a Polish cinematographer and director who has worked on over forty Polish and foreign films. He is especially known for his collaboration with director Krzysztof Kieślowski as well as Ridley Scott and David Yates.

In 2019, the American Society of Cinematographers included Three Colours: Blue shot by Idziak on the list of the best-photographed films of the 20th century.

Life and career
Idziak was born on 25 January 1945 in Katowice, Poland. In 1969, he graduated from the National Film School in Łódź. He has made fourteen films with Krzysztof Zanussi, including Kontrakt (The Contract), The Constant Factor and A Year of the Quiet Sun. He worked on all the early films of Krzysztof Kieślowski, including his television, feature film and foreign debuts, additionally, the two collaborated on A Short Film About Killing, The Double Life of Véronique and Three Colors: Blue.

He has made films with such directors as Ridley Scott, John Sayles, Michael Winterbottom and John Duigan, and has also written and directed two films himself. He worked on Winterbottom's film I Want You, where he won an Honourable Mention at the 48th Berlin International Film Festival.

He moved to more mainstream films such as Gattaca (1997), Proof of Life (2000), Black Hawk Down (2001), and King Arthur (2004). In 2002, he was nominated for an Academy Award as well as a BAFTA for 'Best Cinematography' in the film Black Hawk Down. 

Idziak was the director of photography for Harry Potter and the Order of the Phoenix, the fifth film adaptation of J. K. Rowling's popular fantasy series, directed by David Yates. He is also Director of Photography for Battle of Warsaw 1920 - the first of his films, and the first ever Polish-language feature film, to be shot in 3D.
 
Sławomir Idziak teaches at film schools in Berlin, London and Copenhagen, and also conducts seminars in cinematography in other countries. He is currently working on a Virtual Film Studio Web site called Film Spring Open which gives users an opportunity to present work to global audiences and to make films online. Participants can share ideas, exchange equipment or write scripts together. The aim is to create an international community of filmmakers who will support each other, make films together and will care about the advertising and distribution of their films.

In 2012, he was awarded the Order of Polonia Restituta for his "outstanding achievements for the Polish and world culture" and in 2014, he became the recipient of the Gold Medal for Merit to Culture – Gloria Artis.

Personal life
Sławomir was married to actress Maria Gładkowska.

Filmography

Films

Television

TV movies

Short films

See also
Cinema of Poland
List of Poles
List of Polish Academy Award winners and nominees

References

External links

 Sławomir Idziak  at Culture.pl

1945 births
Living people
Łódź Film School alumni
Polish cinematographers
People from Katowice